Karl Yngve Sköld (29 April 1899 – 6 December 1992) was a Swedish composer, pianist and organist. As well as writing orchestral, solo and chamber music and giving public concerts, he also worked for the Swedish Film industry.

Life

He was born in Vallby, Södermanland County, Sweden. His father, a cantor and college teacher, died when Yngve was ten years old.

He studied piano with Richard Andersson and attended the Royal College of Music, Stockholm from 1915 to 1918 where he learnt composition and counterpoint with Harald Fryklöf. During his teens, his musical talent both as composer and pianist became apparent; his 1916 piano trio, first symphony (opus 3, 1915) and first piano concerto (opus 7, 1917) were among a number of works composed in this period. He passed the organists' examination in 1919.

He then studied abroad from 1920 to 1922, first at the Brno Conservatory, where he won first prize in a piano competition for his performance of Beethoven's fifth piano concerto, and then at the Prague Conservatory's Meisterschule, where he performed his Concert Fantasy for piano and orchestra (opus 21, composed in 1921). In 1933, after returning to Stockholm, he passed the advanced examination in choir direction and music teaching.

During his career he went on to compose many orchestral works, including three more symphonies and ten concerti. He wrote piano and organ pieces, chamber music, vocal and choral music, and music for several films. His music is late Romantic, imaginative and technically impressive, with some national influences. The second symphony is especially worthy of note. The unusual number of his compositions featuring the viola may be related to the fact that his brother, an engineer, was a lifelong enthusiastic player of the instrument.

Sköld continued to perform, including employment as pianist, organist and composer by the Swedish Film Industry from 1923, even appearing in two films: Bara en trumpetare (Just a Trumpeter) in 1938, and then as a theatre piano player in the 1940 film Kyss henne! (Kiss Her!). He also gave annual new year organ concerts in Stockholm City Hall during the thirties.

He was music librarian to the Society of Swedish Composers from 1938 to 1964 and was secretary and treasurer of the Swedish Occidental Association from 1936 to 1964. He retired in 1964.

Sköld was the author of the first original music composed in the auxiliary language Occidental; in 1934 he wrote two pieces,  Du canzones, for three-part female choir and piano to words by Czech poet Jaroslav Podobsky. The two songs were entitled Alaude, canta! (Sing, lark) and Ne abandona me (Don't leave me).

Sköld died in 1992 in Ingarö, Värmdö municipality, Sweden, leaving his widow Olga, his son Gunnar and daughter-in-law Solveig, and his grandson.

Works

Sköld's works include:

His music was also used in the 2000 film Skönheten skall rädda världen.

Discography

Several commercial recordings have featured or included Sköld's works:
1999 – Marteau: His Swedish Colleagues | includes Sköld's Melody for Violin and Piano (Caprice CAP21620)
2001 – Svensk Pianomusik, Vol. 1: Skärgårdsskisser | includes Sköld's Preludio e Fuga quasi una fantasia op. 20 (Phono Suecia PSCD715)
2002 – Symfoni Nr 2 Op 36 / Violinkonsert Op 40 | Sköld (Phono Suecia PSCD719)
2006 – Swedish Romance for Meditation | includes Sköld's Berceuse (Naxos Catalogue No: 8.570303)
2008 – Poem for Cello & Piano, Cello Sonata, Suite for Horn & Piano | Sköld (Sterling CDA1665)
2009 – The Symphonic Swedish Organ | includes Sköld's Adagio (Proprius PRCD2052)
2010 – Svenska tangenter Svenska pianister före 1950 | includes the second movement of Sköld's second piano sonata, played by the composer (Caprice CAP21681)
2011 – Den Bästa Stunden | includes Sköld's Berceuse (Carpe Diem CDCD002)

References

External links

1899 births
1992 deaths
20th-century organists
20th-century classical pianists
20th-century Swedish male musicians
20th-century Swedish musicians
Swedish classical composers
Swedish film score composers
Swedish classical pianists
Swedish classical organists
Male film score composers
Male classical pianists
Male classical organists
Prague Conservatory alumni
People from Södermanland
Interlingue
Music librarians
Brno Conservatory alumni